Flyglobespan, a now defunct British low-cost airline based in Edinburgh, Scotland, operated scheduled services to the following destinations (at December 2009):

Africa 
Egypt
Hurghada - Hurghada International Airport
Sharm el-Sheikh - Sharm el-Sheikh International Airport

Americas

North America 
 Canada
 Calgary - Calgary International Airport (seasonal)
 Vancouver - Vancouver International Airport (seasonal)
 Halifax - Halifax Robert L. Stanfield International Airport (seasonal)
 Greater Toronto - Hamilton International Airport (seasonal)
 United States of America
 Orlando - Orlando Sanford International Airport (seasonal)
 New York - John F. Kennedy International Airport

Europe 
 Croatia
Dubrovnik - Dubrovnik Airport [seasonal]
 Cyprus
 Paphos - Paphos International Airport
 France
 Nice - Côte d'Azur Airport [seasonal]
 Ireland
 Dublin - Dublin Airport [seasonal]
 Portugal
 Faro - Faro Airport
 Funchal - Madeira Airport
 Spain
 Alicante - Alicante Airport
 Barcelona - Barcelona Airport [seasonal]
 Lanzarote - Arrecife Airport
 Las Palmas de Gran Canaria - Gran Canaria Airport
 Málaga - Málaga Airport
 Palma de Mallorca - Son Sant Joan Airport
 Tenerife - Reina Sofía Airport
 Switzerland
 Geneva - Geneva Airport [seasonal]
 Turkey
Dalaman - Dalaman Airport [seasonal]
 United Kingdom
 Scotland
 Aberdeen - Aberdeen Airport Base
 Edinburgh - Edinburgh Airport Base
 Glasgow - Glasgow Airport Base
 England
 Liverpool - Liverpool John Lennon Airport Base
Northern Ireland
 Belfast - Belfast International Airport [seasonal]
England
 Teesside - Durham Tees Valley Airport [seasonal]

References 

Lists of airline destinations